Two Missionaries is a 1974 Italian comedy film starring the comedy team of Bud Spencer and Terence Hill.

Synopsis
Two missionaries (Bud Spencer and Terence Hill) come into conflict with the authorities when they turn their missionary into a parrot farm. The Bishop of Maracaibo calls them his 'black sheep' and the Monsignore has been called to check on their behavior. Like usual, our heroes help the poor to defend themselves and provoke some funny fist fights in the process.

Cast
Terence Hill as Father J.
Bud Spencer as Father Pedro de Leon
Robert Loggia as Governor Alfonso Felipe Gonzaga
Jean Pierre Aumont as Monsignor Delgado
Jacques Herlin as The Bishop
Mario Pilar as Menendez
Maria Cumani Quasimodo as Marquise Gonzaga

References

External links

1974 films
1970s adventure comedy films
Italian adventure comedy films
Films directed by Franco Rossi
Films scored by Guido & Maurizio De Angelis
Terence Hill and Bud Spencer
Films set in the 1890s
Films set in Venezuela
Films about Catholic priests
Films produced by Dino De Laurentiis
1974 comedy films
1970s Italian-language films
1970s Italian films